Colobosauroides cearensis is a species of lizard in the family Gymnophthalmidae. It is endemic to Northeast Brazil.  The species lives in leaf litter.  Males are larger than females.

References

Colobosauroides
Reptiles of Brazil
Endemic fauna of Brazil
Reptiles described in 1991
Taxa named by Osvaldo Rodrigues da Cunha
Taxa named by José Santiago Lima-Verde
Taxa named by Almira Cláudia Marinho Lima